Dornelas is a freguesia in Aguiar da Beira Municipality, Guarda District, Portugal. The population in 2011 was 690, in an area of 23.75 km2.

Demography

References 

Freguesias of Aguiar da Beira